Country-wide local elections for seats in municipality and county councils were held throughout Norway in 1975. For most places this meant that two elections, the municipal elections and the county elections ran concurrently. This was also the first time ever county elections were held in Norway.

Results

Municipal elections
Results of the 1975 municipal elections.

County elections
Results of the 1975 county elections.

References

Local elections in Norway
1970s elections in Norway
Norway
Local